Tatiana Maria Renata Eugenia Elisabeth Margarete Radziwiłł of Trąby  (born 28 August 1939) is a French-Polish aristocrat, bacteriologist, and nurse. The eldest daughter of Prince Dominik Rainer Radziwiłł and Princess Eugénie of Greece and Denmark, she is a member of the House of Radziwiłł and a close relative to the Greek, Danish, and Spanish royal families and the former imperial families of Austria, France, and Russia. She served as a bridesmaid at the Wedding of Prince Juan Carlos of Spain and Princess Sophia of Greece and Denmark in 1962 and at the wedding of Constantine II of Greece and Princess Anne-Marie of Denmark in 1964. She has remained a close friend and courtier of her cousin, Queen Sofía of Spain.

Early life and family 
Radziwiłł was born in Rouen, Normandy on 28 August 1939 to Prince Dominik Rainer Radziwiłł, an officer in the Polish Army, and Princess Eugénie of Greece and Denmark, a member of the Greek Royal Family. She is a member of the House of Radziwill, a Polish-Lithuanian noble family, and is the granddaughter of Prince Hieronim Mikołaj Radziwiłł and Archduchess Renata of Austria. Her maternal grandparents were Prince George of Greece and Denmark, second son of George I of Greece and Olga Constantinovna of Russia, and Princess Marie Bonaparte, daughter of Roland Napoléon Bonaparte, 6th Prince of Canino and Musignano and Marie-Félix Blanc. Her paternal grandparents were Archduchess Renata of Austria and Prince Hieronim Mikołaj Radziwiłł. Radziwiłł's parents divorced in 1946. Her father remarried in 1947 to Lida Lacey Bloodgood, daughter of Lida Fleitmann Bloodgood, and her mother remarried in 1949 to Prince Raimondo della Torre e Tasso, 2nd Duke of Castel Duino.

A few days after her birth, World War II began in Europe. Radziwiłł and her parents fled their home in 1940 after the Fall of France, taking refuge in Saint-Tropez before going in to exile in South Africa, then part of the British Empire. They were later joined by her grandparents, Prince George of Greece and Denmark and Princess Marie Bonaparte, as well as other members of the Greek royal family, including Crown Princess Frederika and her children. Throughout her childhood, Radziwiłł became close friend with her second cousin, Princess Sophia of Greece and Denmark (the future Queen of Spain). She also spent a lot of her childhood with her maternal grandmother, Princess Marie, who was a psychoanalyst and authored Le Livre de Tatiana shortly after Tatiana's birth. She later accompanied her maternal grandparents on trips to North America, Africa, Asia, and around Europe.

Radziwiłł returned to France in 1945 following the end of the war, just three years after the birth of her brother, Prince George. She was educated in schools in France and in Greece, studying music and languages.

Public life and royal duties 
As a relative of many reining royal families in Europe, Radziwiłł attended various events across the continent including the Coronation of Elizabeth II in 1953 and the Royal Cruise Agamemnon in 1954. As a young woman, Radziwiłł was considered as a potential wife for the future Harald V of Norway. In 1956, she was part of the official entourage at a reception for King Paul of Greece in Bois de Boulogne and at the Hôtel de Ville, Paris. She remained close to the Greek royal family, serving as a bridesmaid for her cousin, Princess Sophia, when she married the future King of Spain in 1962. Radziwiłł  served alongside Princess Irene of Greece and Denmark, Princess Irene of the Netherlands, Princess Alexandra of Kent, Princess Anne d'Orléans, Infanta Pilar of Spain, Princess Anne-Marie of Denmark, and Princess Benedikte of Denmark.

In March 1963, Tatiana Radziwiłł attended the festivities celebrating the 100th Anniversary of the Greek Monarchy. She was present at the doxology service, a parade, and a gala performance at the National Theatre of Greece. Later that year, she attended a lunch at Mon Repos held in honor of Athenagoras I of Constantinople. In August 1963, she accompanied the Crown Prince of Greece while he hosted the 11th World Scout Jamboree.

In 1964, she served as a bridesmaid in the wedding of her cousins, Constantine II of Greece and Princess Anne-Marie of Denmark.

In 2021 she attended the wedding of Prince Philippos of Greece and Denmark and Nina Flohr.

Personal life 
While studying nursing and bacteriology at the University of Paris, Radziwiłł met the cardiologist Jean Henri Fruchard, the son of Colonel Henri Fruchard. They married on 24 March 1966 in Athens. Their wedding was attended by members of the Greek and Danish royal families, including King Constantine II of Greece, Queen Anne-Marie of Greece, Dowager Queen Frederica of Greece, Queen Ingrid of Denmark, Princess Alice of Greece, Princess Irene, and Princess Sophia.

Radziwiłł and Fruchaud have two children, Fabiola (born 1967) and Alexis (born 1969).

A close friend of Queen Sofía of Spain, Radziwiłł has accompanied the queen on international trips and attends events at Zarzuela Palace and Marivent Palace.

She is the custodian of the records, archives, and written works of her grandmother, Princess Marie Bonaparte. She is also a Dame Grand Cross of the Order of Saints Olga and Sophia and was awarded the Commemorative Badge of the Centenary of the Kingdom of Greece.

Popular culture 
Radziwiłł is portrayed by Paloma Bloyd in Antonio Hernández's 2011 Spanish television film directed Sofía. She was also portrayed in Benoît Jacquot's 2004 television film Princesse Marie. In his 2013 book, La récréation, Frédéric Mitterrand writes about attending an exhibition on Princess Marie Bonaparte with Radziwiłł.

Ancestry

References 

Living people
1939 births
French bacteriologists
French exiles
French people of Austrian descent
French people of Danish descent
French people of Polish descent
French women nurses
Citizens of Poland through descent
Scientists from Rouen
Polish bacteriologists
Tatiana
Women bacteriologists
World War II refugees